Delaware's 7th Senate district is one of 21 districts in the Delaware Senate. It has been represented by Democrat Spiros Mantzavinos since 2020, following his defeat of incumbent Republican Anthony Delcollo.

Geography
District 7 covers the immediate western suburbs of Wilmington in New Castle County, including Elsmere, Newport, Westminster, Anglesey, and other unincorporated areas.

Like all districts in the state, the 7th Senate district is located entirely within Delaware's at-large congressional district. It overlaps with the 4th, 13th, 19th, and 21st districts of the Delaware House of Representatives.

Recent election results
Delaware Senators are elected to staggered four-year terms. Under normal circumstances, the 7th district holds elections in presidential years, except immediately after redistricting, when all seats are up for election regardless of usual cycle.

2020

2016

2012

Federal and statewide results in District 7

References 

7
New Castle County, Delaware